Brigadier Adrian Stuart d'Hagé,  is a former Australian military officer and a novelist.

Military career
d'Hagé was born in Sydney, New South Wales, and educated at North Sydney Boys High School and the Royal Military College, Duntroon. He graduated into the Australian Army Intelligence Corps in 1967, and was later transferred to Infantry and served in Vietnam as a platoon commander, where he was awarded the Military Cross. His service in the Australian Army included command of the 6th Battalion, Royal Australian Regiment and appointment as Director of Joint Operations for Defence. In 1980 he was awarded the National Medal. In 1990 he was promoted to brigadier as Head of Defence Public Relations.

In 1993 d'Hagé was made a Member of the Order of Australia in recognition of service to the army and the Defence Force in the fields of operational planning and public information. His last appointment was Head of Defence Planning for security of the 2000 Sydney Olympics, including defence against chemical, biological, radiological and nuclear threats (CBRN).

Later career
In October 2000 d'Hagé left the army to pursue a writing career, moving to Italy to complete The Omega Scroll, a fictional thriller centred on the Catholic Church. He holds an honours degree in theology. He began his studies believing in Christianity and graduated with no "fixed religion." He has a Bachelor of Applied Science (Dean's Award) in oenology from Charles Sturt University.

On 13 July 2016, d'Hage graduated from the Australian National University with a Doctor of Philosophy on 'The Christian Right in American Politics and Support for Israel'.

Novels
 The Omega Scroll (2006,) 
 The Beijing Conspiracy (2008)
 The Maya Codex (2011)
 The Inca Prophecy (2012)
 The Alexandria Connection (2014)
 The Russian Affair (2018)

References

External links

Author profile, penguin.com.au
Short bio and photo, 21 August 2007, abc.net.au
Interview and photo, 12 August 2007, theage.com.au

Living people
Military personnel from New South Wales
Australian brigadiers
Royal Military College, Duntroon graduates
Australian military personnel of the Vietnam War
Members of the Order of Australia
Recipients of the Military Cross
21st-century Australian novelists
Australian male novelists
Australian thriller writers
Year of birth missing (living people)